Peter Marshall (born 1952) is a British journalist and broadcaster who has worked across national and international media since 1978, primarily for the BBC.

Education
He was educated at Rhyl Grammar School, De La Salle College, Jersey, and the pioneering Communication Studies course at Birmingham Polytechnic.

Career
After reporting for the Birkenhead News and Radio City in Liverpool, he joined BBC Radio 4 in 1978.

He joined BBC TV's Newsnight in 1987, specialising in investigative reporting from the UK and around the world, with particular focus on the U.S. He covered Ronald Reagan's 1980 election for BBC Radio 4's The World at One and reported on America at key points throughout the George H. Bush, George W. Bush and the Bill Clinton administrations. He also covered the election and first term of the Obama presidency.

He has made numerous long-form documentaries, including Digging the Dirt on the 2000 US election campaign, The Trillion Dollar Conman on football and international fraud, Cops On Drugs, To Catch A Cop, Tragedy at Smolensk, The King Of Corruption and Hillsborough: How They Buried The Truth 

He now works as a freelance for broadcast and print, presenting investigative documentaries on BBC Radio 4, for BBC TV, and ITV.

Awards
 Peter's Hillsborough: How They Buried The Truth won the Bulldog Award for investigative journalism 
 His investigation into the wrongful dismissal of Metropolitan Police Sergeant Gurpal Singh Virdi won the Commission for Racial Equality's Race in the Media Award (RIMA).

References

BBC News people
Living people
1952 births